Third Man on the Mountain is a 1959 American family adventure film by Walt Disney Productions, directed by Ken Annakin and starring Michael Rennie, James MacArthur and Janet Munro. Set during the golden age of alpinism, its plot concerns a young Swiss man who conquers the mountain that killed his father. It is based on Banner in the Sky, a James Ramsey Ullman 1955 novel about the first ascent of the Citadel, and was televised under this name.

Cast
Michael Rennie as Captain John Winter
James MacArthur as Rudi Matt
Janet Munro as Lizbeth Hempel
James Donald as Franz Lerner
Herbert Lom as Emil Saxo
Laurence Naismith as Teo Zurbriggen
Lee Patterson as Klaus Wesselhoft
Walter Fitzgerald as Herr Hempel
Nora Swinburne as Frau Matt
Ferdy Mayne as Andreas Krickel
Roger Delgado as Italian climber (uncredited)
Helen Hayes as a tourist (uncredited)
Kenneth Brannan as a tourist (uncredited)

Production

Original novel
The film was based on the 1954 novel Banner in the Sky by James Ramsey Ullman, who had written The White Tower. The novel was based on the real life first ascent of the Matterhorn in 1865. Captain John Winter was based on Edward Whymper but the young character of Rudi was entirely fictional. The New York Times called it "a superb mountain climbing story for younger readers".

Development
Movie rights were bought by Disney in July 1957. It was his fifth film shot in Britain, following Treasure Island, Robin Hood, The Sword and the Rose and Rob Roy.

In January the lead role was given to James MacArthur, who had just been in Disney's The Light in the Forest. Eleanor Griffin was assigned to write the script. The job of directing was given to Ken Annakin, who had made a number of films for Disney. David Niven was to play the other lead.

In June 1958 Michael Rennie replaced David Niven.

Janet Munro made the film as the second in a five-picture deal with Disney, the first being Darby O'Gill and the Little People.

Shooting
Filming began June 23, 1958.  The film was made on location in Switzerland with Gaston Rébuffat as the head of the mountain second unit photography. it was mostly shot in Zermatt, a location that Walt Disney was familiar with from his ski trips. The studio portions of the film were done in London. Zermatt was the model for the fictional town of Kurtal. Mountaineering scenes were shot in Rotenboden.

The entire cast and crew, numbering 170, did a course in mountaineering before filming began on June 23, 1958.

James Donald fell eighteen feet off a crag shooting a scene but escaped with minor injuries. Assistant cameraman Pierre Tairraz fell in a crevasse and broke three ribs.
 
The extraordinary difficulty of making this film on the Matterhorn was chronicled in the "Perilous Assignments" episode of Walt Disney Presents.

Helen Hayes visited her son MacArthur on location and told Disney that she wished she could be in the film. Disney had a small role written for her.

"On my day off I climbed the Matterhorn," said MacArthur.

Post-production
The musical score for Third Man on the Mountain was composed by William Alwyn and features the original song "Climb the Mountain" by Franklyn Marks.

Reception
Bosley Crowther of The New York Times wrote that "it is open to question whether the techniques of climbing pictured here, and some of the desperate deeds of mountaineering, were used almost a hundred years ago. Be that as it may, and however one feels about accuracy, the business of mountain climbing is excitingly visioned all the way ... What's more, the scenery is lovely." Variety said, "It has the sort of high altitude thrills to send the viewer cowering deep in his seat and the sort of moving drama to put him on the edge of it." Philip K. Scheuer of the Los Angeles Times wrote, "The scenery alone ... is worth the price. A Walt Disney company spent grueling months in the Swiss Alps grinding out painful shot after shot, but they came back with a Technicolor treat that is high on suspense, excitement and simple, uncomplicated fun." Richard L. Coe of The Washington Post declared it "a fine example of a Disney Fiction Film, well photographed and welcomely wholesome." Harrison's Reports said, "As is the case with most Disney productions, meticulous attention has been paid to production values, and the film is overloaded with cloying sentiment. However, it is difficult to present a logical argument against a successful formula, and there seems to be no reason to deviate businesswise from the recent Disney pattern." The Monthly Film Bulletin called the mountain scenes "almost continuously impressive and terrifying. But Ken Annakin seems happier selecting camera angles and arranging foolhardy action sequences than directing dialogue. Everyone but Michael Rennie and James MacArthur overacts vigorously, possibly in an effort to prevent the valley scenes seeming too elementary for schoolboy audiences. But in fact the whole buoyant and absurdly exciting production seems set fair to become a children's screen classic."

The film inspired the Matterhorn Bobsleds attraction at Disneyland Park when Disney sent a souvenir on a postcard to his lead imagineer at the time writing only two words: “build this”.

See also
 List of American films of 1959

References

External links 
  
 
 

1959 adventure films
1959 films
American adventure films
American coming-of-age films
Films based on American novels
Films directed by Ken Annakin
Films produced by Bill Anderson (producer)
Films produced by Walt Disney
Films set in the Alps
Films set in Switzerland
Films set in the 1860s
Films shot in Switzerland
Films shot in London
Matterhorn
Mountaineering films
The Mickey Mouse Club serials
Walt Disney Pictures films
Films scored by William Alwyn
1950s English-language films
1950s American films